Inderpal Singh Sagu (Punjabi: ਇੰਡਰਪਾਲ ਸਿੰਘ ਸਗੂ, born 25 July 1980), better known by his stage name Indy Sagu, is a British Sikh record producer, singer and DJ. Sagu has made a global name for himself as a leading Asian pioneer of fusion genre, his urbanized record production infuses the sounds and incorporates the elements, musical instruments, and hook lines of traditional bhangra with urban western sounds, primarily with a special emphasis on American hip hop.

Life and musical career
Indy Sagu was born and raised in Bradford, UK and began his professional musical career in his hometown in 1996. Sagu's musical talents were essentially inherited from his family's musical background. From an early age his father taught him how to play various Indian instruments such as the harmonium, dholki, tumbi, and tabla and Indy then taught himself to play the keyboards and drums.

Having purchased his first set of turntables at age 16 he quickly made his debut in the Asian underground scene and became known throughout the UK as the pioneering DJ who infused traditional bhangra sounds into an urbanized street sound that was simply fun and unique. Indy spent the proceeding four years in the DJ circuit and while DJing at major Asian events he began focussing on his record production and keyboard skills. His musical record production talents lead to him being signed with Untouchables Records in 2000 and he then focussed on music production for other artists and began featuring on various compilation albums alongside American labels Warner Bros. Records, Virgin Records, Sony BMG, and EMI Records. The release of these urban compilation albums firmly established Indy as a pioneering record producer. Indy established a reputation as the Asian sensation hailing for the Untouchables Record label and was featured in The Face Magazine gaining the label "The Asian So Solid Crew."

In 2001, Indy's breakthrough album The Debut launched his career in spectacular form by topping the UK Asian music billboards with hit releases "Bari Khol Khe," "Come to me Beautiful-Aja Soneeay," and "Let's Laugh & Dance-Haseeai Nacheeay." He won the UK Best Newcomer Award for his solo album The Debut. The Debut was critically acclaimed and was one of the most successful albums on the UK Album charts. It was the release of this album which helped popularize him as an artist and record producer worldwide particularly among the South Asian community.

In 2004, Indy released his second album entitled Indystructable which fulfilled the sudden demand surging from Britain for a genre combination of Bhangra and Hip Hop sounds. The album was significantly influenced by both sounds and the resulting sound was praised to be a genre that was inexplicable and distinctive to the record producer Indy himself. Hit releases were "Son of a Sadar-Putt Saradaran Dhe," and "Let's Dance-Dovey Nachiey."  This success helped further establish
Indy as a major recognized urban Sikh artist and record producer across the Asian and mainstream community. Shortly after Sagu featured on the Asian Beat Bazaar compilation alongside Virgin and EMI and featured on The Rough Guide to Bhangra Album alongside the World Music Network. This album brought together legendary Asian artists onto one album and was accredited as playing a major role within the Bhangra music scene especially within the Asian Diaspora community, this further helped extend Sagu's international fan-base.

Sagu parted from Untouchables Records in 2004 and established himself as an entrepreneur, he founded his own independent label Lioncore Records and owns his own publishing company. Under his formed label he launched his third album Reincarnated in 2008 which served to re-affirm his artistic musical recording production talents. This album as the name suggests was the rebirth of Sagu both personally and as an artist in many ways. Empowering releases with strong meaningful lyrical content were "Gabru Top Dha," "Punjabi Gabru," and "Gideh Vich.". During the launch of this album Sagu assumed the role of being the record producer and record executive. 

Indy is set to release his highly anticipated exclusive 2010 bootleg IndyNation. The album features legendary hip hop artists and the overall project serves to pave the way to a new generation of music. From the samples released he has received praise for his creative, original, and innovative fusion record production abilities of British bhangra and hip hop and is being referred to as the urban producer who is producing hit releases which represent what today's generation musical wants to hear. The entire album alongside all his other solo and compilation albums have been musically composed, arranged, produced, and mastered completely by Indy himself.

Over the years Indy has toured internationally entertaining and performing in front of energized crowds and has collaborated with renowned Indian Artists Surinder Shinda, Kuldeep Manak, Bally Sagoo and performed alongside So Solid Crew, Jay Sean and legendary Hip Hop artists Public Enemy, Pras from the Fugees, Craig David, and Sean Paul. His international fan-base serves to demonstrate that his music has no boundaries as it attracts diverse crowds of all ages, cultures, and backgrounds.

Musical sound and inspiration
Sagu has found much success in record producing across many genres of music, particularly in his speciality of bhangra, hip hop, house, UK garage, and rock. Sagu spends ample time exploring and experimenting with a variety of sounds from various genres of music. Drawing on this wide array of genre inspiration he concentrates on the production of music, specifically infusing traditional Punjabi music with sounds from around the world. Sagu spends much time learning percussion with the goals to introduce new vibrant beats, well structured rhythms, funky riffs, sync fuelled anthems, and captivating melodies along with meaningful lyrical content, all of which results in a refinement of a uniquely fused urbanized East-West street sound. His sound is also strongly influenced by his personal life experiences and his Sikh heritage. He encompasses these inspirational influences and incorporates them into the production of his music. Sagu is recognized as a leader who has redefined the music industry by focusing on creating a defying musical niche of fusion British bhangra that is distinct to him.

As a record producer, musician, and artist Sagu is the head director who assumes the main leadership role of inspiring consistent ingenuity and motivation to continuously exceed his artistic musical capabilities. Sagu's signature is to musically compose, arrange, produce and master all musical tracks with live multi-layered instruments, with string arrangements, and piano loops. He is a multi-talented musician who prefers to personally play in live instruments of the harmonium, tabla, dholki, drums, and keyboards into his work.

Charity supporter
Sagu in 2008 formed an alliance with the UK Beat Bullying Organization. Sagu has become an official representative of the renowned two time award-winning UK Beat Bullying charitable organization. His mission is to support and promote this charity by educating and entertaining people through his music. He strongly believes music is a powerful tool in influencing and expanding people's social consciousness and uses his music to unleash his suppression and to reach out to others. Sagu has taken a personal interest in helping people who have and who continue to be a victim of bullying and has therefore devised a campaign entitled "Don't Be A Victim" in support of the BeatBullying charity. Through this campaign he plans to bring global awareness that bullying exists and there are support systems for anyone who is being bullied. The campaign focuses significantly on empowering others to help reduce and whenever possible deter the increasing incidents of bullying amongst young adults as well as encouraging young adults to begin adapting a lifestyle that is "Bully-Free."

Sagu formed an affiliation in 2009 with UK Desi Donors Organization and stands proud to say "I’m a Desi Donor, are you?" Sagu is an official supporter of the Desi Donors Organization. Desi Donors aim is to promote and raise awareness for Bone Marrow and Blood Donation's within the Asian and ethnic communities. Their aim is to get more people on The Anthony Nolan Bone Marrow Trust's register of potential donors as there is currently an urgent need to increase the representation of Asians and minority ethnic communities on the register. In being an official representative of Desi Donors, Sagu will support the organization by using the power of his music to raise awareness and expand people's societal consciousness of the importance of being a donor. He will use the power of his music to educate and reach out to the Asian and ethnic communities.

Discography

Albums
TBA – Indy Sagu's Fourth Studio Album (2011) Lioncore Records
IndyNation (2010) Lioncore Records
Reincarnated (2008) Lioncore Records
Indystructable (2004) Untouchables Records
The Debut (2002) Untouchables Records

Compilation albums 
Bhangra Dance (2006) World Music Network
Urban Explosion (2004) Warner Bros. Records
Asian Beat Bazaar (2004) Virgin Records / EMI
Danger 3 (2004) Untouchables Records
Bombay Mix (2003) Sony BMG
Urban Flavas 2 (2003) Untouchables Records
Heavy (2003) Untouchables Records
Danger 2 (2002) Untouchables Records
Urban Flavas (2002) Untouchables Records
Sounds of the North (2002) Untouchables Records
Danger (2001) Untouchables Records

Collaborations
Kuldeep Manak, "Metz & Trix" (2001)
Metz & Trix, "Danger" (2001)
Gubi Sandhu, "Dil Karda" (2003)
Lehmber Hussainpuri, "Indystructable" (2004)
Manak-E, "Indystructable" (2004)
RDB, "Reincarnated" (2008)
Ranjit Mani, "Danger 2" (2002)

References

External links
Official Website

1980 births
Living people
British record producers
Virgin Records
UK garage musicians
Musicians from London
English hip hop musicians
English record producers
American music industry executives
Bhangra (music) musicians
English people of Indian descent
English Sikhs
Bhangra (music)
Punjabi people
Indian Sikhs
Performers of Sikh music
Businesspeople from New York (state)
Brit Award winners
Desi musical groups
English people of Punjabi descent